The Morgan Morgan Monument, also known as Morgan Park, is a  roadside park in the unincorporated town of Bunker Hill in Berkeley County, West Virginia. It is located along Winchester Avenue (U.S. Route 11) and Mill Creek. The park features a granite monument that was erected in 1924 to memorialize Morgan Morgan (1688–1766), an American pioneer of Welsh descent, who was among the earliest European persons to settle permanently within the present-day boundaries of West Virginia.

The West Virginia Legislature appropriated funds for the construction of the Morgan Morgan Monument in 1923. West Virginia Governor and Morgan descendant Ephraim F. Morgan appointed and oversaw a committee of three people to plan and supervise the monument's construction: Haze Morgan, another Morgan descendant and the commission's chairperson; Blanche M. Pickering (Mrs.A.A. Pickering) of Rowlesburg; and West Virginia State Senator Harry P. Henshaw of Bunker Hill. A dedication and unveiling ceremony was held for the monument on September13, 1924, and Governor Morgan served as the principal speaker.

Initially owned by the West Virginia Monuments Commission following the monument's establishment in 1924, the Morgan Morgan Monument was transferred to the West Virginia Road Commission, which maintained it as a roadside park from 1924 to 1956. From 1956 to 1970, the park was managed by the West Virginia Conservation Commission's Division of State Parks as a West Virginia state park. It was the only West Virginia state park ever to have been located within Berkeley County. The West Virginia Road Commission (now known as the West Virginia Division of Highways) resumed its operation of the Morgan Morgan Monument in 1970, and the division continues to maintain the monument as a roadside park. In 1980 the Morgan Morgan Monument and its park were included as a contributing property in the Mill Creek Historic District on the National Register of Historic Places.

Geography and setting 
The Morgan Morgan Monument, also known as Morgan Park, consists of a  park, the 1924 granite monument to Morgan Morgan, and two West Virginia highway markers immediately south of the monument. One highway marker features a brief biography of Morgan Morgan, and the other describes Morgan Acres, the possible location of the first structure built by Morgan as a crude shelter.

The monument is situated within the unincorporated town of Bunker Hill in Berkeley County, West Virginia. The monument's park is bound to its west by Winchester Avenue (U.S. Route 11) and the route's bridge over Mill Creek, to its north by a filling station parking lot, to its east by a gravel parking area, and to its south by Mill Creek, which flows from west to east into Opequon Creek. Several springs lie to the south of the monument along the southern edge of Mill Creek.

The Morgan Morgan Monument lies within the Mill Creek Historic District near several Morgan family properties in the Bunker Hill and Gerrardstown areas listed on the National Register of Historic Places (NRHP).

History

Morgan Morgan's settlement and significance 

The monument memorializes Morgan Morgan (1688–1766), an American pioneer of Welsh descent who was among the earliest Europeans to settle permanently within the boundaries of the present-day U.S. state of West Virginia.

The Mill Creek watershed and the land upon which the Morgan Morgan Monument is located were originally part of the Northern Neck Proprietary, a land grant that the exiled Charles II, King of England, awarded to seven of his supporters in 1649 during the English Interregnum. Following the Restoration in 1660, CharlesII finally ascended to the English throne. CharlesII renewed the Northern Neck Proprietary grant in 1662, revised it in 1669, and again renewed the original grant favoring original grantee Thomas Colepeper, 2nd Baron Colepeper, and Henry Bennet, 1st Earl of Arlington, in 1672. In 1681 Bennet sold his share to Lord Colepeper, who received a new charter for the entire land grant from James II, King of England, in 1688. Following the deaths of Lord Colepeper, his wife Margaret, and his daughter Katherine, the Northern Neck Proprietary passed to Katherine's son Thomas Fairfax, 6th Lord Fairfax of Cameron, in 1719.

Morgan Morgan arrived in the Bunker Hill area circa 1731 when it was still a part of Spotsylvania County, and he was given a  land grant of the Northern Neck Proprietary's land on December12, 1735. Morgan was believed to have been the first European to permanently settle in present-day West Virginia; however, German settlers may have inhabited Shepherdstown as early as 1727. Morgan became active in local governance, and was appointed a justice of the peace for Spotsylvania County by the Virginia Governor's Council on April23, 1734. Orange County was created from Spotsylvania in late 1734, and Morgan continued on as a justice of the peace for the new county. In January 1735 when the Orange County Court first convened, Morgan served on its new commission of the peace. Morgan also served as captain of the Orange County militia. He worked to develop the region's road network and infrastructure, and is credited with developing and overseeing the construction of a route between Bunker Hill and Winchester. Morgan also operated an ordinary on his property.

Morgan was instrumental in helping to create Frederick County from Orange County in 1738. Morgan served as a justice of the peace on the Frederick County Court's commission of the peace when it was convened in 1743. Morgan also served as a vestryman of the Frederick Parish of the Anglican Church. Around 1740 he established present-day West Virginia's first Anglican Communion church along with settlers John Briscoe and Jacob Hite. The church was originally built as a log structure known as Morgan's Chapel, and after its reconstruction in 1851, it became known as Christ Episcopal Church. Morgan Morgan and his family are interred in the church's adjoining cemetery. After Morgan's death, Berkeley County was created in 1772 from the northern third of Frederick
County.

Morgan's original log cabin was constructed between 1731 and 1734. This structure was rebuilt and restored with many of its original logs in 1976 as a West Virginia and Berkeley County Bicentennial Project. Wood siding was added to the cabin's exterior in 1994 to protect the original logs. Morgan Cabin, Cool Spring Farm, and the surrounding  are owned by the Berkeley County Historical Landmarks Association and managed by a special committee of the association.

Monument establishment 

During its 1923 legislative session, the West Virginia Legislature passed a bill (introduced by West Virginia State Senator Harry P. Henshaw of Bunker Hill) appropriating $5,000 toward a monument memorializing Morgan Morgan in Bunker Hill. The bill was approved by West Virginia Governor Ephraim F. Morgan, a direct descendant of Morgan. The bill stated that Morgan Morgan was "a man of high character who, by his efforts and example, was largely useful in the community of which he was the founder". It also proclaimed that the monument to Morgan would "commemorate his life and deeds". Half of the bill's appropriation was disbursed in 1924, and the other half was disbursed later in 1925. The monument was to be located at or near Morgan's burial site at Morgan Chapel. The bill stipulated that the monument would be planned and supervised by the Morgan Morgan Monument Commission, which was to consist of three members appointed by the Governor, who was to oversee the commission. On the morning of January2, 1924, Governor Morgan appointed the committee, which consisted of Haze Morgan, another direct descendant of Morgan and the commission's chairperson; Blanche M. Pickering (Mrs.A.A. Pickering) of Rowlesburg; and West Virginia State Senator Harry P. Henshaw of Bunker Hill. The commission purchased a  lot for $420 for the construction of the monument in Bunker Hill.

The granite Morgan Morgan Monument was erected in 1924. It was unveiled and dedicated during a ceremony held on September13, 1924, and arranged by the Colonel Morgan Morgan Chapter of the Daughters of the American Revolution (DAR) of Clarksburg, two local DAR chapters, and several Virginia DAR chapters. Governor Morgan, who appointed and oversaw the monument's commission, was the principal speaker at the ceremony and delivered its chief address. Governor Morgan also accepted the monument on behalf of the state of West Virginia. Charles James Faulkner, former United States Senator from West Virginia, gave a speech about Morgan and the early history of Berkeley County. The local students of Bunker Hill formed a chorus to perform at the ceremony. The actual unveiling of the monument was performed by Morgan descendant Anna Mildred Morgan of the Colonel Morgan Morgan Chapter of the DAR. A benediction was given by Morgan Chapel rector Rev. J.L. Oldham. The Colonel Morgan Morgan Chapter of the DAR planted a tree near the monument at the conclusion of the dedication program. In addition to the Colonel Morgan Morgan Chapter of the DAR, organizers of the dedication ceremony included Morgan Morgan Monument Commission chairman Haze Morgan and members Blanche M. Pickering and Harry P. Henshaw. Several hundred attendees were present at the dedication ceremony, mostly from the immediate area, Clarksburg, Fairmont, and nearby communities in Virginia. Also held in connection with the dedication was a family reunion of Morgan Morgan's descendants.

Later in 1924, the West Virginia Monuments Commission transferred the monument site to the West Virginia Road Commission because the Monuments Commission felt the Road Commission was better suited to maintain the monument due to its equipment. Following its transfer to the Road Commission, the park added a tourist camp and became the first free public tourist attraction in the state of West Virginia.

The roadside park was occasionally utilized by local organizations for the hosting of events, including by the Rest Church of nearby Rest, Virginia.

Park development and maintenance 

In 1925 the Legislature established the State Forest, Park and Conservation Commission to study and investigate the opportunities and needs for forests, parks, game preserves, and recreational areas in West Virginia. In 1927 the Commission provided its recommendations to the Legislature, which included a recommendation for a State Monument System. In its list of extant historical monuments to be included in this system, the Commission named the Grave Creek Mound in Moundsville, the Point Pleasant Monument (now Tu-Endie-Wei) in Point Pleasant, the James Rumsey Monument in nearby Shepherdstown, the Cadell Rifle Range in Preston County, and the Morgan Morgan Monument.

In 1956 the Morgan Morgan Monument and Roadside Park was transferred to the ownership of the West Virginia Conservation Commission's Division of State Parks, thus making it a part of the West Virginia state parks system. It was the only state park ever to have been operated in Berkeley County. The monument and its adjoining park were under the jurisdiction of Cacapon Resort State Park in nearby Omps. Its maintenance was the responsibility of Cacapon Resort State Park's supervisor James Ambrose and his subordinate personnel. In 1960 the Morgan Morgan Monument was listed in a National Park Service (NPS) tabulation of U.S. state parks and was categorized as a "state monument" under the governance of the West Virginia Conservation Commission's Division of State Parks. The NPS noted that the small park lacked water recreation, overnight accommodations, and eating accommodations.

In 1962 the monument was included as a stop on the Annual House and Garden Tour of Shepherdstown, Martinsburg, Charles Town, and Harpers Ferry, which was sponsored by the Shenandoah–Potomac Garden Council. Between July 1, 1963, and June 30, 1964, the West Virginia Conservation Commission's Division of State Parks recorded the attendance of 1,500 visitors to the Morgan Morgan Monument, the lowest figure in the state park system. A 1964 NPS survey of West Virginia state park facilities noted that the Morgan Morgan Monument was a "day and weekend use" park whose only significant feature was its historical relevance. In 1966 the West Virginia Historic Commission erected two West Virginia highway markers within the park to the immediate south of the monument: one with a brief biography of Morgan and the other detailing nearby Morgan Acres. In early 1970 the ownership and operation of the monument and park were transferred to the West Virginia State Road Commission, which later became known as the West Virginia Division of Highways under the West Virginia Department of Transportation. The Morgan Morgan Monument became a contributing property of the Mill Creek Historic District on the NRHP on December10, 1980. As of 2016, the park is erroneously listed in the West Virginia Blue Book as Bunker Hill State Park. The Blue Book is an annual guide published by the West Virginia Legislature.

Monument description 

The Morgan Morgan Monument consists of a tall granite stone from Barre, Vermont, atop a concrete foundation. The monument measures  in total height. A  medallion of the Seal of West Virginia is affixed to the top of the monument's main (western) façade, over two indented lines within the stone. The following inscription is etched into the stone below the seal: "COL. MORGAN MORGAN NOV. 1, 1688 – NOV. 17, 1766". Below the inscription is a plaque that reads:

See also 

 List of West Virginia state parks
 Mill Creek Historic District (Bunker Hill, West Virginia)
 National Register of Historic Places listings in Berkeley County, West Virginia

References

Bibliography

External links 
 

1924 establishments in West Virginia
1956 establishments in West Virginia
1970 establishments in West Virginia
1970 disestablishments in West Virginia
Buildings and structures completed in 1924
Buildings and structures in Berkeley County, West Virginia
Former state parks of West Virginia
Granite sculptures in West Virginia
Historic district contributing properties in West Virginia
Morgan family of West Virginia
Monuments and memorials on the National Register of Historic Places in West Virginia
National Register of Historic Places in Berkeley County, West Virginia
Parks on the National Register of Historic Places in West Virginia
Protected areas established in 1956
Protected areas established in 1970
Protected areas of Berkeley County, West Virginia
Roadside parks
Tourist attractions in Berkeley County, West Virginia
U.S. Route 11